Alexandre Franca "Pequeno" Nogueira (born January 15, 1978) is a Brazilian Luta Livre fighter and the former Shooto Lightweight Champion, a Japanese mixed martial arts organization. Nogueira began his professional career at the age of 20, defeating Noboru Asahi.

The California State Athletic Commission (CSA) had suspended Alexandre Nogueira, for one year and fined him $2,500, for failing a drug test at a June 1, 2008 WEC show. He tested positive for Boldenone, a banned substance.

Championships and Accomplishment
Shooto
Shooto Lightweight (143 lbs.) Championship
Six Successful Title Defenses

Mixed martial arts record

|-
| Win
| align=center| 18–6–3
| Denison Silva
| Submission (heel hook)
| THF: The Hill Fighters
| 
| align=center| 2
| align=center| 0:23
| Rio Grande do Sul, Brazil
|
|-
| Win
| align=center| 17–6–3
| Antonio Barajas
| Submission (guillotine choke)
| RDC MMA: Reto de Campeones 2
| 
| align=center| 1
| align=center| 2:06
| Mexico City, Federal District, Mexico
|
|-
| Win
| align=center| 16–6–3
| Marc Gomez
| Decision (unanimous)
| RDC MMA: Reto de Campeones MMA
| 
| align=center| 5
| align=center| 3:00
| Mexico City, Federal District, Mexico
|
|-
| Win
| align=center| 15–6–3
| D'Juan Owens
| KO (head kick)
| Inka FC 23: Pequeno vs. Owens
| 
| align=center| 4
| align=center| N/A
| Lima, Peru
|
|-
| Draw
| align=center| 14–6–3
| D'Juan Owens
| Draw (majority)
| Inka FC 21: Private 
| 
| align=center| 3
| align=center| 5:00
| Lima, Peru
|
|-
| Win
| align=center| 14–6–2
| Payaso Loco
| Submission (punches)
| DDT: Duelo de Titas 
| 
| align=center| 1
| align=center| 2:15
| Mato Grosso, Brazil
| 
|-
| Loss
| align=center| 13–6–2
| Takeshi Inoue
| TKO (punches)
| Vale Tudo Japan 2009
| 
| align=center| 4
| align=center| 2:58
| Tokyo, Japan
| 
|-
| Loss
| align=center| 13–5–2
| José Aldo
| TKO (punches)
| WEC 34: Faber vs. Pulver
| 
| align=center| 2
| align=center| 3:22
| Sacramento, California, United States
| 
|-
| Win
| align=center| 13–4–2
| Shuichiro Katsumura
| KO (punch)
| Hero's 9
| 
| align=center| 2
| align=center| 1:55
| Yokohama, Japan
| 
|-
| Loss
| align=center| 12–4–2
| Kotetsu Boku
| Decision (unanimous)
| Hero's 6
| 
| align=center| 2
| align=center| 5:00
| Tokyo, Japan
| 
|-
| Loss
| align=center| 12–3–2
| Hideo Tokoro
| KO (spinning back fist)
| Hero's 2
| 
| align=center| 3
| align=center| 0:08
| Tokyo, Japan
| 
|-
| Win
| align=center| 12–2–2
| João Roque
| Decision (unanimous)
| G-Shooto: Special 01
| 
| align=center| 3
| align=center| 5:00
| Tokyo, Japan
| Defended Shooto Lightweight (143 lbs.) Championship
|-
| Win
| align=center| 11–2–2
| Hideki Kadowaki
| Submission (guillotine choke)
| Shooto: Year End Show 2004
| 
| align=center| 1
| align=center| 3:34
| Tokyo, Japan
| Non-Title Bout
|-
| Win
| align=center| 10–2–2
| Rumina Sato
| Submission (guillotine choke)
| Shooto: Year End Show 2003
| 
| align=center| 1
| align=center| 0:41
| Urayasu, Japan
| Non-Title Bout
|-
| Draw
| align=center| 9–2–2
| Stephen Palling
| Draw
| Shooto: 8/10 in Yokohama Cultural Gymnasium
| 
| align=center| 3
| align=center| 5:00
| Yokohama, Japan
| Retained Shooto Lightweight (143 lbs.) Championship
|-
| Win
| align=center| 9–2–1
| Hiroyuki Abe
| Submission (rear naked choke)
| Shooto: Year End Show 2002
| 
| align=center| 1
| align=center| 3:53
| Urayasu, Japan
| Defended Shooto Lightweight (143 lbs.) Championship
|-
| Loss
| align=center| 8–2–1
| Hiroyuki Abe
| KO (punch)
| Shooto: Treasure Hunt 8
| 
| align=center| 1
| align=center| 4:37
| Tokyo, Japan
| Non-Title Bout
|-
| Win
| align=center| 8–1–1
| Katsuya Toida
| Decision (unanimous)
| Shooto: To The Top Final Act
| 
| align=center| 3
| align=center| 5:00
| Urayasu, Japan
| Defended Shooto Lightweight (143 lbs.) Championship
|-
| Win
| align=center| 7–1–1
| Tetsuo Katsuta
| Submission (guillotine choke)
| Shooto: To The Top 8
| 
| align=center| 2
| align=center| 2:45
| Tokyo, Japan
| Defended Shooto Lightweight (143 lbs.) Championship
|-
| Loss
| align=center| 6–1–1
| Tetsuo Katsuta
| Decision (majority)
| Shooto: To The Top 4
| 
| align=center| 3
| align=center| 5:00
| Tokyo, Japan
| Non-Title Bout
|-
| Win
| align=center| 6–0–1
| Stephen Palling
| Submission (guillotine choke)
| Shooto: R.E.A.D. Final
| 
| align=center| 2
| align=center| 1:19
| Urayasu, Japan
| Non-Title Bout
|-
| Win
| align=center| 5–0–1
| Uchu Tatsumi
| Submission (guillotine choke)
| Shooto: R.E.A.D. 9
| 
| align=center| 1
| align=center| 1:57
| Yokohama, Japan
| Defended Shooto Lightweight (143 lbs.) Championship
|-
| Win
| align=center| 4–0–1
| Mamoru Okochi
| Decision (unanimous)
| Shooto: R.E.A.D. 3
| 
| align=center| 3
| align=center| 5:00
| Kadoma, Japan
| Non-Title Bout
|-
| Draw
| align=center| 3–0–1
| Uchu Tatsumi
| Draw
| Vale Tudo Japan 1999
| 
| align=center| 3
| align=center| 8:00
| Urayasu, Japan
| 
|-
| Win
| align=center| 3–0
| Noboru Asahi
| Technical Submission (guillotine choke)
| Shooto: Renaxis 4
| 
| align=center| 2
| align=center| 3:29
| Tokyo, Japan
| Won Shooto Lightweight (143 lbs.) Championship
|-
| Win
| align=center| 2–0
| Masahiro Oishi
| Submission (armbar)
| Shooto: Renaxis 1
| 
| align=center| 1
| align=center| 3:11
| Tokyo, Japan
| 
|-
| Win
| align=center| 1–0
| Noboru Asahi
| Technical Submission (guillotine choke)
| Shooto: Shoot the Shooto XX
| 
| align=center| 1
| align=center| 1:06
| Yokohama, Japan
|

See also
 List of male mixed martial artists

References

External links
 

1978 births
Living people
Brazilian male mixed martial artists
Brazilian practitioners of Brazilian jiu-jitsu
Featherweight mixed martial artists
Mixed martial artists utilizing Luta Livre
Mixed martial artists utilizing Brazilian jiu-jitsu
Mixed martial artists utilizing catch wrestling
Sportspeople from Rio de Janeiro (city)
Brazilian sportspeople in doping cases
Doping cases in mixed martial arts
Brazilian catch wrestlers